Umut Deger Tohumcu (born 11 August 2004) is a German professional footballer descent who plays as a midfielder for Bundesliga club Hoffenheim.

Career
Tohumcu is a youth product of the academies of Offenburger FV, SC Freiburg and TSG 1899 Hoffenheim. At 14, he received some attention when he was a ballboy at Hoffenheim, as he quickly threw the ball to Andrej Kramarić who then scored a against Bayern Munich in a win on 9 September 2017. He made his professional debut with Hoffenheim in a 5–1 Bundesliga loss to Borussia Mönchengladbach on 14 May 2022, coming on as a late substite in the 86th minute.

International career
Born in Germany, Tohumcu is of Turkish descent. Tohumcu is a youth international for Germany, having represented the Germany U15s, 16s, U17s, and U18s.

References

External links
 
 DFB Profile

2004 births
Living people
People from Offenburg
Sportspeople from Freiburg (region)
German footballers
Germany youth international footballers
German people of Turkish descent
TSG 1899 Hoffenheim players
Bundesliga players
Association football midfielders
Footballers from Baden-Württemberg